Adriaan "Adje" Paulen (12 October 1902, Haarlem – 9 May 1985, Eindhoven) was a Dutch athlete who competed from 1917 to 1931. During World War II, he was part of the Dutch resistance in the Netherlands. Following World War II, Paulen became a sports official, becoming president of the IAAF (then International Amateur Athletic Federation), serving from 1976 to 1981.

Sporting career
Competing in three Summer Olympics, Paulen earned his best finish of seventh in the 800 m event at Antwerp in 1920. In 1924, he became first of over forty world record breakers (up to his 1985 death) in athletics at Bislett stadion in Oslo, setting a record in 500 m, then an official distance. Besides competing at the 1928 Summer Olympics in Amsterdam, Paulen was also a member of the Organizing Committee.

Stepping down from his athletic career in 1931, Paulen also participated in the Monte Carlo Rally eight times and once competed in the Dutch TT MotoGP event. In his youth, Paulen competed in football (soccer) at an international level.

World War II
When Nazi Germany invaded the Netherlands in May 1940, Paulen joined the Nederlandsche Unie, an organisation that strived for co-operation with the German occupier. In August 1940 Paulen participated in fusion talks between the Nederlandse Unie and the fascistic Nationaal Front, which original name was Zwart Front (Black Front). Other participants for the Nederlandse Unie during these talks were Jan de Quay, after the war minister-president, Louis Einthoven, former head of the Rotterdam police and afterwar director of the BVD (secret service) and Hans Linthorst Homan, commissioner of the Queen in the province Groningen. For the Nationaal Front the infamous fascist Leader Arnold Meijer was head of a four men delegation. During these talks Jan de Quay, head of the delegation of the Nederlandse Unie, called himself a fascist, the Nederlandse Unie a fascistic organisation and said that he opposed democracy. The fusion talks failed.

Later during the war Paulen was engineer at a coal mining industry Staatsmijnen. Workers started a strike and Paulen refused to give the Germans a list of strikers and was convicted to death, however Paulen was released soon. In 1944 Paulen crossed the front and joined the allied troops. Paulen met some of the British Army forces during Operation Market Garden in September 1944. Paulen kept a diary regarding Operation Market Garden and its aftermath that was released to the public in 1989, four years after his 1985 death, including meeting with United States Army officials during that time and would eventually be made a Colonel in the US Army.

Medal of Freedom and Knighthood 
On 7 January 1946, by general order number 8, Paulen was awarded the US Medal of Freedom with bronze palm. On 12 September 1947, by Royal Decree, Paulen was knighted by Queen Wilhelmina of the Netherlands, receiving the fourth class (Knight) of the Military William Order. The Order is the highest and oldest military honour of the Kingdom of the Netherlands, bestowed for "performing excellent acts of Bravery, Leadership and Loyalty in battle". The award is comparable to the British Victoria Cross and seldom awarded.

Sporting official
Following the end of World War II, Paulen played a key role in rebuilding the IAAF in 1946. He also served as president from the Dutch Athletic Committee (KNAU) from 1946 to 1964. In 1965, Paulen served as director of the Dutch Olympic Committee, a position he held until 1970. While working for the KNAU and Dutch Olympic Committee, he also served as an official for the IAAF. Paulen's best known role as an IAAF official was at the 1972 Summer Olympics in Munich when he was responsible for the "Cata-Pole" controversy in the men's pole vault and the claim by the pole manufacturers that their poles did not contain carbon fiber even though IAAF rules stated no such requirements. This controversy had a negative impact upon competition which the United States would lose the pole vault gold for the first time in the Summer Olympics. Bob Seagren, who won the pole vault gold at Mexico City in 1968, would finish with silver at Munich. At the end of the competition, Seagren thrust the pole into Paulen's lap, stating he "was returning the unwanted pole back to ...[Paulen]." Paulen succeeded David Burghley as IAAF President in 1976 and served in that position until 1981. During Paulen's tenure, he led the fight to control doping within athletics.

Death and legacy
Paulen died during an operation on a broken hip in 1985. The FBK Games in Hengelo were named in Paulen's honor from 1988 to 2000.

References

1902 births
1985 deaths
Athletes (track and field) at the 1920 Summer Olympics
Athletes (track and field) at the 1924 Summer Olympics
Athletes (track and field) at the 1928 Summer Olympics
Dutch male sprinters
Dutch male middle-distance runners
Dutch footballers
Dutch motorcycle racers
Dutch resistance members
Dutch rally drivers
Dutch referees and umpires
Olympic athletes of the Netherlands
Athletics (track and field) officials
Sportspeople from Haarlem
Knights Fourth Class of the Military Order of William
Association footballers not categorized by position
Presidents of the International Association of Athletics Federations
20th-century Dutch people